Gabriella Boschiero (born 13 January 1972) is an Italian former professional tennis player.

Born in Bologna, Boschiero reaching a best ranking of 174 on the professional circuit, winning five ITF singles titles. Her best performances on the WTA Tour were second-round appearances at the 1988 Taranto Open and 1995 Italian Open. She made the third round of qualifying at the 1995 US Open.

ITF Circuit finals

Singles: 6 (5–1)

Doubles: 10 (4–6)

References

External links
 
 

1972 births
Living people
Italian female tennis players
Sportspeople from Bologna
20th-century Italian women